She Had to Eat is a 1937 American comedy film directed by Malcolm St. Clair and written by Samuel G. Engel. The film stars Jack Haley, Rochelle Hudson, Arthur Treacher, Eugene Pallette, Douglas Fowley and John Qualen. It was released on July 2, 1937, by 20th Century Fox.

Plot

Cast   
Jack Haley as Danny Decker
Rochelle Hudson as Ann Garrison
Arthur Treacher as Carter
Eugene Pallette as Raymond Q. Nash
Douglas Fowley as Duke Stacey
John Qualen as Sleepy
Maurice Cass as Fingerprint Expert
Wallis Clark as Ralph Wilkinson
Lelah Tyler as Mrs. Cue
Tom Kennedy as Pete
Tom Dugan as Rusty
Florence Gill as Singer (uncredited)
Ruth Peterson as Waitress (uncredited)
Sidney Bracey as Waiter (uncredited)
Bud Geary as Policeman (uncredited)
Franklin Pangborn as Mr. Phoecian-Wylie

References

External links 
 

1937 films
1930s English-language films
20th Century Fox films
American comedy films
1937 comedy films
Films directed by Malcolm St. Clair
American black-and-white films
1930s American films